Edward Azrael (June 30, 1907 – November 10, 2001) was an American lawyer and member of the Maryland State Senate from 1968 to 1970.

References

Maryland state senators
1907 births
2001 deaths
University of Baltimore School of Law alumni
Politicians from Philadelphia